The Arizona Cowboy is a 1950 American Western film directed by R. G. Springsteen and written by Bradford Ropes. The film stars Rex Allen, Teala Loring, Gordon Jones, Minerva Urecal, James Cardwell, and Roy Barcroft. The film was released on April 1, 1950, by Republic Pictures.

Premise
A cowboy leaves his rodeo show to help his father who is falsely accused of theft and saves a town from greedy oil barons at the same time.

Cast
Rex Allen as Rex Allen
Teala Loring as Laramie Carson
Gordon Jones as I.Q. Barton
Minerva Urecal as Cactus Kate Millican
James Cardwell as Hugh Davenport
Roy Barcroft as Henchman Mike Slade
Stanley Andrews as Jim Davenport
Harry Cheshire as David Carson 
Edmund Cobb as Sheriff Fuller
Joseph Crehan as Colonel Jefferson
Steve Darrell as Sheriff Mason
Douglas Evans as Rodeo Announcer
John Elliott as Ace Allen
Chris-Pin Martin as Café Owner Pedro
Frank Reicher as Major Sheridan
George Lloyd as Fogarty 
Lane Bradford as Henchman Curley Applegate

References

External links 
 

1950 films
1950s English-language films
American Western (genre) films
1950 Western (genre) films
Republic Pictures films
Films directed by R. G. Springsteen
American black-and-white films
1950s American films